The 2020–21 UNC Wilmington Seahawks men's basketball team represented the University of North Carolina Wilmington during the 2020–21 NCAA Division I men's basketball season. The Seahawks was led by Takayo Siddle, who took over from C.B. McGrath when he was fired by UNCW in January 2020. They played their home games at Trask Coliseum as part of the Colonial Athletic Association.

Previous season
The Seahawks finished the 2019–20 season with a 10–22 record and 5–13 in conference play. They were eliminated in the first round of the 2020 CAA men's basketball tournament when they lost to the Drexel Dragons.

Offseason

Departures

Roster

Schedule and results

|-
!colspan=9 style=| Non-conference regular season
|-

|-
!colspan=9 style=| CAA regular season

|-
!colspan=9 style=| CAA tournament
|-

Source:

References

UNC Wilmington Seahawks men's basketball seasons
UNC Wilmington
UNC Wilmington
UNC Wilmington